Yagudin is a Russian surname. Notable people with the surname include:
Alexei Yagudin (born 1980), Russian figure skater

Russian-language surnames